John True Abbott (1850 – March 8, 1914) was an American diplomat and lawyer who served as the United States Ambassador to Colombia from 1889 to 1893.

Biography
Born in Keene, New Hampshire, he was the son of Rev. Stephen G. and Sarah Burbank (Cheney) Abbott, and he married Alice E. Merriman in 1874. Abbott was educated at Bates College, and read law.  As an attorney, he served as city solicitor and counsel to the Santo Domingo Development Company.  He was nominated as Minister to Colombia in 1889, and served to 1893. He is interred at the Woodland Cemetery in Keene, N.H.

See also
 List of Bates College people

References

External links
 
 The Political Graveyard
 City of Nashua, NH

1850 births
1914 deaths
Ambassadors of the United States to Colombia
19th-century American diplomats
Bates College alumni
People from Keene, New Hampshire
New Hampshire lawyers
19th-century American lawyers